Penicillium decaturense is a species of the genus of Penicillium which was isolated from a fungus in North America. Penicillium decaturense produces citrinin, 15-Deoxyoxalicine B, decaturins A and decaturins A

See also
 List of Penicillium species

References

Further reading
 
 

decaturense
Fungi described in 2005